The eastern cottontail (Sylvilagus floridanus) is a New World cottontail rabbit, a member of the family Leporidae. It is the most common rabbit species in North America.

Distribution
The eastern cottontail can be found in meadows and shrubby areas in the eastern and south-central United States, southern Canada, eastern Mexico, Central America and northernmost South America. It is also found on the Caribbean island of Margarita. It is abundant in Midwest North America. Its range expanded north as forests were cleared by settlers. Originally, it was not found in New England, but it has been introduced and now competes for habitat there with the native New England cottontail. It has also been introduced into parts of Oregon, Washington, and British Columbia. In the 1950s and 1960s, the eastern cottontail was introduced to France and northern Italy, where it displayed a rapid territorial expansion and increase in population density.

The population in the mountains of the southwestern United States and western Mexico is now thought to be a distinct species, the robust cottontail (S. holzneri).

Habitat
Optimal eastern cottontail habitat includes open grassy areas, clearings, and old fields supporting abundant green grasses and herbs, with shrubs in the area or edges for cover. The essential components of eastern cottontail habitat are an abundance of well-distributed escape cover (dense shrubs) interspersed with more open foraging areas such as grasslands and pastures. Habitat parameters important for eastern cottontails in ponderosa pine, mixed species, and pinyon (Pinus spp.)-juniper (Juniperus spp.) woodlands include woody debris, herbaceous and shrubby understories, and patchiness. Typically eastern cottontails occupy habitats in and around farms including fields, pastures, open woods, thickets associated with fencerows, wooded thickets, forest edges, and suburban areas with adequate food and cover. They are also found in swamps and marshes and usually avoid dense woods.

Home range
The eastern cottontail home range is roughly circular in uniform habitats. Eastern cottontails typically inhabit one home range throughout their lifetime, but home range shifts in response to vegetation changes and weather are common. The largest ranges are occupied by adult males during the breeding season. Daily activity is usually restricted to 10% to 20% of the overall home range.

In southeastern Wisconsin, home ranges of males overlapped by up to 50%, but female home ranges did not overlap by more than 25% and actual defense of range by females occurred only in the immediate area of the nest. Males fight each other to establish dominance hierarchy and mating priority.

Cover requirements

Eastern cottontails forage in open areas and use brush piles, stone walls with shrubs around them, herbaceous and shrubby plants, and burrows or dens for escape cover, shelter, and resting cover. Woody cover is extremely important for the survival and abundance of eastern cottontails. Eastern cottontails do not dig their own dens (other than nest holes) but use burrows dug by other species such as woodchucks. In winter when deciduous plants are bare eastern cottontails forage in less secure cover and travel greater distances. Eastern cottontails probably use woody cover more during the winter, particularly in areas where cover is provided by herbaceous vegetation in summer. In Florida slash pine flatwoods, eastern cottontails use low saw-palmetto (Serenoa repens) patches for cover within grassy areas.

Most nest holes are constructed in grasslands (including hayfields). The nest is concealed in grasses or weeds. Nests are also constructed in thickets, orchards, and scrubby woods. In southeastern Illinois tall-grass prairie, eastern cottontail nests were more common in undisturbed prairie grasses than in high-mowed or hayed plots. The nest is lined with grass and fur.

Description
The eastern cottontail is chunky, red-brown or gray-brown in appearance, with large hind feet, long ears, and a short, fluffy white tail. Its underside fur is white. There is a rusty patch on the tail. Its appearance differs from that of a hare in that it has a brownish-gray coloring around the head and neck. The body is lighter color with a white underside on the tail. It has large brown eyes and large ears to see and listen for danger. In winter the cottontail's pelage is more gray than brown. The kits develop the same coloring after a few weeks, but they also have a white blaze that goes down their forehead; this marking eventually disappears. The female tends to be heavier, although the sexes broadly overlap in size. There may be some slight variation in the body size of eastern cottontails, with weights seeming to increase from south to north, in accordance with Bergmann's rule. Meanwhile, 346 adult cottontails from Michigan were found to have averaged  in mass. Due to Eastern Cottontails being so small and since they don’t usually fight back they are easy prey for other animals such as coyotes, bobcats, and even foxes.

Behavior
The eastern cottontail is a very territorial animal. The cottontail prefers an area where it can be out in the open but hide quickly. Forests, swamps, thickets, bushes, or open areas where shelter is close by are optimal habitation sites for this species. Cottontails do not dig burrows, but rather rest in a form, a shallow, scratched-out depression in a clump of grass or under brush. It may use the dens of groundhogs as a temporary home or during heavy snow.

Eastern cottontails are crepuscular to nocturnal feeders; although they usually spend most of the daylight hours resting in shallow depressions under vegetative cover or other shelter, they can be seen at any time of day. Eastern cottontails are most active when visibility is limited, such as rainy or foggy nights. Eastern cottontails usually move only short distances, and they may remain sitting very still for up to a few hours at a time. Eastern cottontails are active year-round.

Reproduction

The onset of breeding varies between populations and within populations from year to year. The eastern cottontail breeding season begins later with higher latitudes and elevations. Temperature rather than diet has been suggested as a primary factor controlling onset of breeding; many studies correlate severe weather with delays in the onset of breeding. In New England breeding occurs from March to September. In New York the breeding season occurs from February to September, in Connecticut from mid-March to mid-September. In Alabama the breeding season begins in January. In Georgia the breeding season lasts nine months and in Texas breeding occurs year-round. Populations in western Oregon breed from late January to early September. Mating is promiscuous.

The nest is a slanting hole dug in soft soil and lined with vegetation and white fur from the mother's underside. The average measurements are: length , width , and depth . The average period of gestation is 28 days, ranging from 25 to 35 days. Eastern cottontail young are born with a very fine coat of hair and are blind. Their eyes begin to open by four to seven days. Young begin to move out of the nest for short trips by 12 to 16 days and are completely weaned and independent by four to five weeks. Litters disperse at about seven weeks. Females do not stay in the nest with the young but return to the opening of the nest to nurse, usually twice a day.

Reproductive maturity occurs at about two to three months of age. A majority of females first breed the spring following birth; but 10% to 36% of females breed as juveniles (i.e., summer of the year they were born). Males will mate with more than one female. Female rabbits can have one to seven litters of one to twelve young, called kits, in a year; however, they average three to four litters per year, and the average number of kits is five. In the southern states of the United States, female eastern cottontails have more litters per year (up to seven) but fewer young per litter. In New England female eastern cottontails have three or four litters per year. The annual productivity of females may be as high as 35 young.

Diet
The diet of eastern cottontails is varied and largely dependent on availability. Eastern cottontails eat vegetation almost exclusively; arthropods have occasionally been found in pellets. Some studies list as many as 70 to 145 plant species in local diets. Food items include bark, twigs, leaves, fruit, buds, flowers, grass seeds, sedge fruits, and rush seeds. Leporids including eastern cottontails are coprophagous, producing two types of fecal pellets, one of which is consumed. The redigestion of pellets greatly increases the nutritional value of dietary items.

In summer, eastern cottontails consume tender green herbaceous vegetation when it is available. In many areas Kentucky bluegrass (Poa pratense) and Canada bluegrass (P. compressa) are important dietary components. Other favored species include clovers (Trifolium spp.) and crabgrasses (Digitaria spp.). In Connecticut important summer foods include clovers, alfalfa, timothy (Phleum pratense), bluegrasses (Poa spp.), quackgrass (Elytrigia repens), crabgrasses, redtop (Agrostis alba), ragweed (Ambrosia psilostachya), goldenrods (Solidago spp.), plantains (Plantago spp.), chickweed (Stellaria media), and dandelion (Taraxacum officinale). Eastern cottontails also consume many domestic crops.

During the dormant season, or when green vegetation is covered with snow, eastern cottontails consume twigs, buds, and bark of woody vegetation. In Connecticut, important winter foods include gray birch (Betula populifolia), red maple, and smooth sumac (Rhus glabra).

Mortality
In Kansas, the largest cause of mortality of radiotracked eastern cottontails was predation (43%), followed by deaths due to the research process (19%), and tularemia (18%). A major cause of eastern cottontail mortality is collision with automobiles. In Missouri, it was estimated that ten eastern cottontails are killed annually per mile of road. The peak period of highway mortality is in spring (March through May); roadside vegetation greens up before adjacent fields and is highly attractive to eastern cottontails.

Annual adult survival is estimated at 20%. Average longevity is 15 months in the wild; the longest-lived wild individual on record was five years old. Captive eastern cottontails have lived to at least nine years of age.

Eastern cottontails are hosts to fleas, ticks, lice, cestodes, nematodes, trematodes, gray flesh fly larvae, botfly larvae, tularemia, shopes fibroma, torticollis, and cutaneous streptothricosis. Further summary of diseases and pests is available.

Predators
The eastern cottontail has to contend with many predators, both natural and introduced. Due to their often large populations in Eastern North America, they form a major component of several predators' diets. Major predators of eastern cottontail include domestic cats and dogs, foxes (Vulpes and Urocyon spp.), coyote (C. latrans), bobcat (Lynx rufus), weasels (Mustela spp.), raccoon (Procyon lotor), mink (M. vison), great horned owl (Bubo virginianus), barred owl (Strix varia), hawks (principally Buteo spp.), corvids (Corvus spp.), and snakes.

Predators that take nestlings include raccoon, badger (Taxidea taxus), skunks (Mephitis and Spilogale spp.), Crow, and Virginia opossum (Didelphis virginiana). In central Missouri, eastern cottontails comprised the majority of biomass in the diet of red-tailed hawks (Buteo jamaicensis) during the nesting season. In Pennsylvania, the chief predator of eastern cottontails is the great horned owl. In the Southwest cottontails including eastern cottontail comprise 7 to 25% of the diets of northern goshawk (Accipiter gentilis). In Texas, eastern cottontails are preyed on by coyotes more heavily in early spring and in fall than in summer or winter. In southwestern North Dakota, cottontails (both eastern and desert cottontail Sylvilagus auduboni) were major prey items in the diets of bobcats.

Juvenile eastern cottontails are rare in the diet of short-eared owls (Asio flammeus). Trace amounts of eastern cottontail remains have been detected in black bear (Ursus americanus) scat.

Classification
Recognized subspecies of Sylvilagus floridanus

 North of Mexico
Sylvilagus floridanus alacer
Sylvilagus floridanus chapmani
Sylvilagus floridanus floridanus
Sylvilagus floridanus mallurus
Mexico and Central America
Sylvilagus floridanus aztecus
Sylvilagus floridanus connectens
Sylvilagus floridanus hondurensis
Sylvilagus floridanus macrocorpus
Sylvilagus floridanus orizabae
Sylvilagus floridanus yucatanicus
South of Isthmus of Panama
Sylvilagus floridanus avius
Sylvilagus floridanus cumanicus
Sylvilagus floridanus margaritae
Sylvilagus floridanus nigronuchalis
Sylvilagus floridanus orinoci
Sylvilagus floridanus purgatus
Sylvilagus floridanus superciliaris

References

External links

 Cotton Tail Rabbit, World Wide Outreach Program of The Rouge Foundation
 Eastern Cottontail, Fletcher Wildlife Garden

Sylvilagus
Mammals of Central America
Mammals of Colombia
Mammals of Mexico
Mammals of Canada
Mammals of the United States
Mammals of Venezuela
Mammals of the Caribbean
Mammals described in 1890